Snežana Petrović may refer to:

 Snežana Petrović (Party of United Pensioners of Serbia politician) (born 1972), politician in Serbia
 Snežana Petrović (Serbian People's Party politician) (born 1965), politician in Serbia.